Rick Kennedy (born 11 December 1960) is a former Australian rules footballer who played for the Footscray Football Club in the Australian Football League (AFL).

Footscray team manager Stephen Nash commented that while losing Edmond's experience was difficult (he had played 150 games for Footscray), he was confident Kennedy would fill the role. Kennedy played most of his career as a fullback represented Victoria at a State of Origin game in 1986. A tough and physical player, he was regularly sent to the VFL Tribunal.

Statistics

|- style="background-color: #EAEAEA"
! scope="row" style="text-align:center" | 1981
|style="text-align:center;"|
| 54 || 14 || 2 || 1 || 133 || 60 || 193 || 33 ||  || 0.1 || 0.1 || 9.5 || 4.3 || 13.8 || 2.4 || 
|- 
! scope="row" style="text-align:center" | 1982
|style="text-align:center;"|
| 8 || 13 || 1 || 1 || 105 || 62 || 167 || 32 ||  || 0.1 || 0.1 || 8.1 || 4.8 || 12.8 || 2.5 || 
|- style="background:#eaeaea;"
! scope="row" style="text-align:center" | 1983
|style="text-align:center;"|
| 8 || 11 || 5 || 2 || 58 || 57 || 115 || 21 ||  || 0.5 || 0.2 || 5.3 || 5.2 || 10.5 || 1.9 || 
|- 
! scope="row" style="text-align:center" | 1984
|style="text-align:center;"|
| 8 || 20 || 8 || 4 || 181 || 83 || 264 || 44 ||  || 0.4 || 0.2 || 9.1 || 4.2 || 13.2 || 2.2 || 
|- style="background:#eaeaea;"
! scope="row" style="text-align:center" | 1985
|style="text-align:center;"|
| 8 || 17 || 0 || 1 || 121 || 56 || 177 || 37 ||  || 0.0 || 0.1 || 7.1 || 3.3 || 10.4 || 2.2 || 
|- 
! scope="row" style="text-align:center" | 1986
|style="text-align:center;"|
| 8 || 18 || 2 || 1 || 153 || 53 || 206 || 64 ||  || 0.1 || 0.1 || 8.5 || 2.9 || 11.4 || 3.6 || 
|- style="background:#eaeaea;"
! scope="row" style="text-align:center" | 1987
|style="text-align:center;"|
| 8 || 20 || 2 || 1 || 143 || 77 || 220 || 62 || 14 || 0.1 || 0.1 || 7.2 || 3.9 || 11.0 || 3.1 || 0.7
|- 
! scope="row" style="text-align:center" | 1988
|style="text-align:center;"|
| 8 || 15 || 6 || 0 || 114 || 50 || 164 || 40 || 13 || 0.4 || 0.0 || 7.6 || 3.3 || 10.9 || 2.7 || 0.9
|- style="background:#eaeaea;"
! scope="row" style="text-align:center" | 1989
|style="text-align:center;"|
| 8 || 12 || 5 || 1 || 72 || 37 || 109 || 24 || 13 || 0.4 || 0.1 || 6.0 || 3.1 || 9.1 || 2.0 || 1.1
|- 
! scope="row" style="text-align:center" | 1990
|style="text-align:center;"|
| 8 || 7 || 3 || 0 || 23 || 20 || 43 || 15 || 1 || 0.4 || 0.0 || 3.3 || 2.9 || 6.1 || 2.1 || 0.1
|- style="background:#eaeaea;"
! scope="row" style="text-align:center" | 1991
|style="text-align:center;"|
| 8 || 11 || 0 || 0 || 68 || 66 || 134 || 44 || 13 || 0.0 || 0.0 || 6.2 || 6.0 || 12.2 || 4.0 || 1.2
|- class="sortbottom"
! colspan=3| Career
! 158
! 34
! 12
! 1171
! 621
! 1792
! 416
! 54
! 0.2
! 0.1
! 7.4
! 3.9
! 11.3
! 2.6
! 0.8
|}

References

External links

1960 births
Living people
Western Bulldogs players
Traralgon Football Club players
Victorian State of Origin players
Australian rules footballers from Victoria (Australia)